Solomon Olusola Akanbi is an Anglican bishop in Nigeria: he has been Bishop of the Offa diocese since 2018.

Notes

Anglican bishops of Offa
21st-century Anglican bishops in Nigeria
Year of birth missing (living people)
Living people